The 1998 Daytona 500, the 40th running of the event, was held on February 15 at Daytona International Speedway in Daytona Beach, Florida as the first race of the 1998 NASCAR Winston Cup season. It was memorable in that it marked Dale Earnhardt's only Daytona 500 victory after 19 previous attempts and many heartbreaking finishes. Not only was it Earnhardt's 20th 500 start, but also CBS's 20th consecutive live broadcast of the Daytona 500. Also, his long-awaited Daytona 500 win snapped a 59-race winless streak dating back to Atlanta Motor Speedway in March 1996.

The race was remarkably clean for a restrictor plate race.  There were only three cautions - all of which were for minor incidents (as well, there were no accident-related retirements), and there was a pit stop incident involving Dale Jarrett, Jeff Burton and Derrike Cope but no caution was waved. The race was run under the green flag for the first 125 laps. This resulted in it being the second-fastest Daytona 500 ever, behind the 1980 Daytona 500 won by Buddy Baker, and the fastest of the restrictor plate era.

Background

Daytona International Speedway is a race track in Daytona Beach, Florida that is one of six superspeedways to hold NASCAR races, the others being Michigan International Speedway, Auto Club Speedway, Indianapolis Motor Speedway, Pocono Raceway and Talladega Superspeedway. The track also features two other layouts that utilize portions of the primary high speed tri-oval, such as a  sports car course and a  motorcycle course. The track's  infield includes the  Lake Lloyd, which has hosted powerboat racing. The speedway is owned and operated by International Speedway Corporation.

The track was built by NASCAR founder Bill France, Sr. to host racing that was being held at the former Daytona Beach Road Course and opened with the first Daytona 500 in 1959. The speedway has been renovated three times, with the infield renovated in 2004, and the track repaved in 1978 and 2010.

The Daytona 500 is regarded as the most important and prestigious race on the NASCAR calendar. It is also the series' first race of the year; this phenomenon is virtually unique in sports, which tend to have championships or other major events at the end of the season rather than the start. Since 1995, U.S. television ratings for the Daytona 500 have been the highest for any auto race of the year, surpassing the traditional leader, the Indianapolis 500 which in turn greatly surpasses the Daytona 500 in in-track attendance and international viewing. The 2006 Daytona 500 attracted the sixth largest average live global TV audience of any sporting event that year with 20 million viewers.

Qualifying
Bobby Labonte won the pole position for the Daytona 500 with a time of 46.776 seconds, and his brother Terry qualified on the outside pole position next to him. Sterling Marlin qualified third winning the first Gatorade Twin 125 and Dale Earnhardt qualified fourth winning the second Twin 125.

Race summary

Pre-race buildup
The race began with an emphasis on NASCAR's 50th Anniversary Celebration. The pre-race show on CBS featured some of the greatest Daytona 500 finishes in recent memory. It also detailed the famous Daytona Beach Road Course and it featured Russ Truelove, Buck Baker, Tim Flock, Red Farmer and Junior Johnson on the Daytona Beach with one of Tim Flock's old "Full Jeweled" #300 Chryslers.

The Rev. Hal Marchman gave the traditional invocation, and country/bluegrass music singer Kathy Mattea sang the US National Anthem, but neither was aired on CBS. Kansas Governor Bill Graves and the fans in the stands all gave the command for drivers to start their engines and Pro Football Hall of Famer Dan Marino waved the green flag to start the race.

Caution #1
In the mid-stage of the event, green flag pit stops were still in progress with Jeff Gordon leading and were on pace of breaking the average speed of 198. Ward Burton cut down a tire, leaving debris on the track. This would bring out the first caution.

Caution #2
Late in the race with a possibility of a second round of green-flag stops, John Andretti and Robert Pressley made contact in turn 2 and both spun out, which brought out the second caution.  During pit spots, Dale Earnhardt came out first, Michael Waltrip had a penalty after running over a hose while pitting, thus held back at the rear of the pack.

Caution #3 (Lap 198) and finish

Dale Earnhardt led Bobby Labonte and Jeremy Mayfield heading into turn 2. Lake Speed and John Andretti got together and both cars spun, setting up a scenario where Earnhardt, Labonte, and Mayfield were all in contention for the win. While racing back to the caution flag, the three came up on the lapped car of Rick Mast. Earnhardt easily passed Mast on the outside. Labonte lost Earnhardt's draft while Mayfield sped to the inside of Mast. Earnhardt led Labonte and Mayfield, who were side by side. Earnhardt took the white and yellow flags in first while Labonte edged Mayfield for second by a fender. The race would end under the caution flag. Dale dedicated his win to his late friend and colleague, Neil Bonnett, who died 4 years earlier whilst practicing for the 1994 race.

Results

Quotes 
 "Jean Shepherd once said, 'If horse racing is the sport of kings, then auto racing; this furious, and sometimes brutal game, is the sport of friends.  New, or old; come along, friend, and enjoy the Great American Race!'" — Ken Squier during CBS's pre-race broadcast
 "Labonte up high! Earnhardt uses the lapped car of Rick Mast as a pick! 20 years of trying, 20 years of frustration, Dale Earnhardt will come to the caution flag to win the Daytona 500! Finally! The most anticipated moment in racing. If John Elway can win the Super Bowl, Dale Earnhardt said he could win the Daytona 500. And if he comes around under caution to complete this final lap, the taste of long awaited victory will be his." — Mike Joy commentating the final seconds of the Daytona 500
 "Look, out on pit road!  Every man on every crew has come out to the edge of pit lane to congratulate the man who has dominated everything there is to win in this sport, except this race; until today." — Mike Joy on the crew members congratulating Dale Earnhardt on his Daytona 500 victory
 "The most anticipated moment in the history of motor racing, Dale Earnhardt rolling into Victory Lane in the Daytona 500." — Mike Joy during the broadcast
 "Dale was like a kid at Christmas, and there was a time where I just wanted to sit back and just watch him." — Larry McReynolds on Earnhardt's win
 "It took ten years off my life, if I had made that race, I would have lived another ten years." — Rick Mast on missing the 1997 Daytona 500 after making the 1998 race
 "The Daytona 500 is ours.  We won it, we won it, we won it!" — Dale Earnhardt in victory lane during a post race interview
 "The 20-year quest is over!" — Ken Squier in victory lane after Dale Earnhardt's makes the entrance to victory lane
 "Let me tell you, it'll make the strongest man on earth cry when you win this race, it's special." — Buddy Baker on Earnhardt's win

See also 
1998 in NASCAR

References

External links
Nextel Cup Results msn
Complete weather information(  2013-06-20)

Daytona 500
Daytona 500
NASCAR races at Daytona International Speedway